Trudy Bellinger is a British director, producer and writer. She is most known for directing a short film Killing Christmas which won awards at three film festivals including London International Short Film Festival, Tweetfest Film Festival and Wildsound Feedback Writing and Film Festival. She has also directed TV promo campaigns including Project Runway season 19 (2021/2022) and Masked Singer season 6 2022. From 1992 to 2002 she was Head of Creative Affairs and Music video at EMI Records where she commissioned all the music videos and was creative director for EMI artists. From 2002 she was freelance creative consultant and music video commissioner for Sony, Syco, Universal and many independent labels.

Videography 
1992 to 2013

Music video Commissioner/Creative Director/EP
 Diana Ross
 Geri Halliwell
 Robert Palmer
 David Coverdale Whitesnake
 Iron Maiden
 Eternal
 Terrorvision
 Adam Ant
 Doves
 Starsailor
 Louise Rednapp
 Damage
 Robbie Williams
 Dana Dawson
 Barbara Tucker
 Spiller feat Sophie Ellis-Bextor
 Shy FX and T Power
 Marillion
 Cliff Richard
 David Lyndon Hall
 Dubstar
 Commonwealth
 Aurora
 In Aura
 Bucketheads
 Purple Kings
 Jesus Jones
 Terri Walker
 Reel 2 Real
 Mica Paris
 Vanessa Mae
 Adam F
 Jamiroquai
 Marcy Playground
 New Model Army
 Zucchero
 Paul Young
 The Cranberries
 Nathalie Imbruglia
 Emma Bunton
 Melanie C
 Adam F and Redman
 Adam F and M.O.P
 Thunder
 Michael Barrymore
 Gabriella Climi
 VV Brown
 Bananarama
 Valeriya
 Katherine Jenkins
 McFly
 Dragonette
 Feeder
 Rooster
 Mo Solid Gold
 Lucie Silvas
 Tasmin Archer
 Babylon Zoo
 Amos & Jeremy Healy
 D Mac
 Ben Adams
 Brand New Heavies
 McAlmont and Butler
 Sigur Ros
 Twin Atlantic
 The Temper Trap

1997
 Louise – Let's Go Round Again (co-directed with Cameron Casey)

1998
 Louise – All That Matters (co-directed with John Clayton)

2002
 Shy FX & T-Power feat. Di – Shake Your Body
 3SL – Touch Me Tease Me (Version 1)
 3SL – Touch Me Tease Me (Version 2 feat. Estelle)
 Shy FX & T-Power feat. Di & Skibadee – Don't Wanna Know

2003
 Louise – Pandora's Kiss
 Sophie Ellis-Bextor – I Won't Change You

2004
 Girls Aloud – The Show
 Girls Aloud – I'll Stand By You

2005
 Bodyrockers – I Like The Way (You Move)
 Rachel Stevens – I Said Never Again (But Here We Are)

2007
 Sugababes vs. Girls Aloud – Walk This Way for comic relief
 Shapeshifters – Pusher
 Bodyrockers – round and round
 Therese – Feelin' Me
 Girls Aloud – Sexy! No No No
 Dima Bilan – Number One Fan
 Madu – everywhere

2008
 Girls Aloud – The Promise
 Dima Bilan – Lonely
 Slava – Moon
 Victoria – Gone
 Girls Aloud – The Loving Kind

2009
 Emma Deigman – It Was You
 Pixie Lott – Mama Do
 The Saturdays – Forever Is Over
 Katherine Jenkins- wake me up inside
 Rhydian – O fortuna
 Rimmel featuring Kate Moss
 Gillette Venus

2010
 M & S Spring fashion 2010
 MM & SAutumn fashion 2010
 Joe McElderry – Someone Wake Me Up
 Snuggles

2011
 Sky Living Rebrand
 Dove Deodorant
 Britain's Next Top Model with Elle Macpherson
 Garnier Rediscover BelleColour
 Dionne Bromfield – Foolin'
 International videos for Chronicles of Narnia soundtrack

2012
 Leona Lewis – Lovebird
 Next Top Model
 Julia Lezhneva -Hallelujah
 X Factor Wishing on a Star featuring One Direction

2013
 The Saturdays – Gentleman
Next Top Model
Got to Dance

2014 to 2022
 Olay
 Colgate Expert White
 Cazzette
 Whitney Woerz – Love me Not
 Boy George – I don't love you
 Love Gold David Thomas x jewellery
 The Secret Life of Marilyn Monroe featuring Kelly Garner (Lifetime)
 Sophia Kameron
 Slendertone
 Sunsilk
 Voila Hair
 The Bachelorette
 Rejoice hair
 Lakme skin
 Project Runway Season 19 promo campaign 2021/22
 The Masked Singer Season 7 2022
 Clarence
 Pitchslapped
 Games People Play season 1 promos
 Scandal
 The Catch
 Injustice Nancy Grace
 Marilyn Monroe Reframed
 David Thomas X
 The Megan Pormer Show (Fox 13) 12 episodes- showrunner/producer/director
 Killing Christmas short film
 Maison Margiela Mutiny Social media perfume campaign – creative director and commissioner for John Galliano

References 

 FRANK Oct/Nov 2019 by The Frank Magazine – Issuu
 Meet Trudy Bellinger – Voyage LA Magazine | LA City Guide
 The Music Video Database 
 http://www.gosee.de/news/film/crossroads-films-praesentiert-trudy...land-s-next-top-model-featuring-elle-macpherson-13703?gos_lang=en
 Trudy Bellinger at Clipland

Living people
Year of birth missing (living people)
British music video directors